Viktor Nikolaev Popov (born 5 March 2000) is a Bulgarian professional footballer who plays as a right-back for Cherno More Varna.

Born and raised in Varna, Popov joined Cherno More's academy in 2010. He made his senior debut in May 2019, aged 19. Popov has also represented Bulgaria at various youth levels and made his senior debut in November 2019.

Career
Popov made his first team debut for Cherno More in a 1–0 home win against Botev Plovdiv on 18 May 2019, playing full 90 minutes. Ten days later he signed his first professional contract with the club.

International career
On 14 November 2019, he earned his first cap for Bulgaria, coming on as a late second half substitute for Strahil Popov in the 0–1 home loss against Paraguay in a friendly match.

Career statistics

Club

References

External links
 

Living people
2000 births
Bulgarian footballers
Bulgaria youth international footballers
Bulgaria international footballers
PFC Cherno More Varna players
First Professional Football League (Bulgaria) players
Association football defenders
Sportspeople from Varna, Bulgaria